Volodymyr Zinchenko (born 28 May 1959 in Zaporizhya) is a former discus thrower from Ukraine, who represented the Unified Team at the 1992 Summer Olympics and Ukraine in 1996 Summer Olympics. He is a three-time national champion for Ukraine and four-time champion of the Soviet Union in the men's discus throw event. His first name is also spelled in Ukrainian as Volodymyr.

His personal best is 68.88, which is also Ukraine's national record.

References
1994 Year Ranking
sports-reference

1959 births
Living people
Ukrainian male discus throwers
Athletes (track and field) at the 1992 Summer Olympics
Olympic athletes of the Unified Team
Sportspeople from Zaporizhzhia
CIS Athletics Championships winners
Soviet Athletics Championships winners